"I Gotta Right to Sing the Blues" is a popular song with music by Harold Arlen and lyrics by Ted Koehler, published in 1932 for the Broadway show Earl Carroll's Vanities (1932).  The song has become a jazz and blues standard. Popular recordings in 1933 and 1934 were those by Cab Calloway, Louis Armstrong and Benny Goodman.

Notable recordings
Ethel Merman (September 29, 1932) (her first solo date and the first recording of the song, backed by Nat Shilkret's orchestra)
Cab Calloway & His Orchestra (November 30, 1932 - Brunswick 6460).
Louis Armstrong & His Orchestra (January 26, 1933, Bluebird 5173).
Lee Wiley & The Dorsey Brothers (March 7, 1933)
Benny Goodman & His Orchestra (Jack Teagarden, trombone, vocals, October 18, 1933, Columbia 2835D).
Louis Armstrong (1937)
Billie Holiday (recorded on April 20, 1939, Commodore 527A).
Jack Teagarden & His Orchestra (1939)
Lena Horne (1941)
Billie Holiday - Velvet Mood (1955)
Art Tatum - Still More of the Greatest Piano of Them All (1955)
Louis Armstrong - I've Got the World on a String (1957)
Judy Garland - Alone (1957)
Julie London - About the Blues (1957)
Billy Eckstine - Billy Eckstine's Imagination (1958)  
Sam Cooke - Tribute to the Lady (1959)
Eileen Farrell - I've Got a Right to Sing the Blues (1960)
Judy Holliday & Gerry Mulligan - Holliday with Mulligan (1961)
Frank Sinatra - Sinatra Sings of Love and Things (1962)
Sarah Vaughan & the Count Basie Orchestra - Send in the Clowns (1981)

References

Songs with music by Harold Arlen
Pop standards
Songs with lyrics by Ted Koehler
1932 songs
Lena Horne songs
Cab Calloway songs
Dorothy Lamour songs